Richard Pennefather may refer to:
 Richard Pennefather (Australian politician) (Richard William Pennefather, 1851–1914), lawyer and politician in Western Australia
 Richard Pennefather (died 1777), Irish MP for Cashel
 Richard Pennefather (died 1831), Irish MP for Cashel
 Richard Pennefather (judge) (1772–1859), Irish judge
 Richard Pennefather (civil servant) (1806–1849), Under-Secretary for Ireland
 Richard Pennefather (auditor general) (c.1828–1865), colonial administrator

See also
 Richard Pennefather Rothwell, Canadian-American civil, mechanical and mining engineer